Regional Development Councils (RDCs) are the highest policy-making body governing the administrative regions of the Philippines. They serve as the subnational counterpart of the National Economic and Development Authority. All but two (Metro Manila and Bangsamoro) of the Philippines 17 regions has a Regional Development Council although Metro Manila has a metropolitan body which serves the same function as an RDC. Bangsamoro, an autonomous region, also has its own equivalent to a RDC.

Metro Manila is recognized in law as a "special development and administrative region," and was thus given a metropolitan authority; the Metro Manila Council within the MMDA serves as the National Capital Region's RDC. The defunct Autonomous Region in Muslim Mindanao's (ARMM) equivalent of an RDC was the Regional Economic and Development Planning Board. 

Under the Bangsamoro Organic Law, Bangsamoro is mandated to maintain the Bangsamoro Economic and Development Council (BEDC) which serves as the autonomous region's equivalent of an RDC.

List

Regional Development Councils (RDCs)

RDC-equivalent body in other regions

References

Local government in the Philippines
Regions of the Philippines